The American diaspora includes multiple instances in which United States citizens have emigrated after marrying members of international noble families.

American citizens born in the United States

American citizens born outside the United States
There are also individuals who were born outside the United States but maintain US citizenship through an American parent:

Notes

References

Married international nobility
Lists of nobility
Lists of people by marital status